Electricity in Cyprus is managed by the Electricity Authority of Cyprus. Power is primarily generated at three fuel oil-burning stations but the use of distributed renewable energy is expanding.

Overview

About 97% of the primary energy use was imported in 2008. However, the European Union RES target (2020) for Cypus is 13% giving Cyprus an opportunity to promote its own energy production and increase its energy independence of export in the near future. According to the national action plan Cyprus expects it will also meet this target.

According to the IEA key statistics 2010 the Cypriotic energy import in 2008 was 5 TWh higher than the primary energy use. If correct, this corresponds about 18% storage capacity of the annual energy use. There was equal imbalance in 2007.

Renewable energy

With feed-in tariff for large wind power plants the Cypriot National Renewable Energy Action Plan targets 6.8% of renewable electricity share from wind power by 2020. In 2005 there was no wind energy, in 2010 3,5% of electricity. The EU countries average target by 2020 is 14%. A recent scientific article published in Renewable and Sustainable Energy Reviews in 2014 by Prof. Mete Feridun of University of Greenwich in London and his colleagues investigates the long-run equilibrium relationship among international tourism, energy consumption, and carbon dioxide emissions, and the direction of causality among these variables. The authors report evidence that international tourism is a catalyst for energy consumption and for an increase in the level of carbon dioxide emissions in Cyprus.

Solar

The Cypriot target of solar power including both photovoltaics and concentrated solar power is combined 7% of electricity by 2020, which will be one of the top ones in the European Union markets. Respective target is in Spain 8%, Germany 7%, Greece 5%, Portugal 4% and Malta 1%.

Solar heating is the usage of solar energy to provide space or water heating. Solar heating per capita in 2010 was the highest in Cyprus of all European countries: 611 W per capita. Corresponding value was in other top EU countries: Austria 385,
Greece 253 and Germany 120. In 2010 this capacity was the lowest in the EU, with high unused domestic energy opportunities, in Finland 4, Latvia 3, Estonia 1 and Lithuania 1. Correspondingly the value was in a Scandinavian country Denmark 68.

Net metering implementation
The Cypriot Energy Regulatory Authority (CERA) announced a number of steps aimed at facilitating development of photovoltaics in Cyprus. Among them is the large-scale application of net metering. CERA aims to reduce electricity prices for the households where net metering is applied, via fuel saving and carbon dioxide reduction. Cyprus introduced net metering as pilot program in 2012. The program concerns selected governmental buildings and a few communities only. Its goal was to gain significant experience and knowledge on how to run the electricity grid using net metering.

Net metering research
The University of Cyprus announced plans for a second 10 to 13 MW solar park in 2013 and that it will lead a €1.3 million research program into the adoption of net metering across the European Union. The UoC will also lead an EU-funded European research program on promoting net metering policies. The university has signed a memorandum of co-operation with the Bishopric of Tamasos and Orini of the Church of Cyprus, to develop a photovoltaic park in the Cypriot capital of Nicosia.

UN's Cyprus PV system
The United Nations Development Programme (UNDP) in Cyprus installed a 15 KW photovoltaic system at its offices. The park cost US$30,000 and is now connected to the grid as well.

Interconnectors

The EuroAsia Interconnector will connect Israel, Cyprus and Greece with 2000 MW HVDC undersea power cable. It is a leading Project of Common Interest of the European Union and also priority Electricity Highway Interconnector Project. Cyprus, as last EU member fully isolated from energy interconnections will be connected to European network.

TheEuroAfrica Interconnector will connect Egypt, Cyprus, and Greece with another 2000 MW HDCV undersea power cable. These projects will allow Cyprus to use cheaper and cleaner electricity from the mainland rather than burn imported oil at less efficient and dirtier generators.

See also

 Block 12
 Solar power in Cyprus
 Renewable energy by country

References